Prolifera may refer to:
 a synonym for Albillo, a grape variety
 Prolifera (alga), a red algae genus in the order Gigartinales